KARS-FM (102.9 FM) is a commercial radio station licensed for Laramie, Wyoming and broadcasting to the Cheyenne, Wyoming and Fort Collins-Greeley, Colorado areas. KARS-FM airs a Rhythmic Top 40 music format branded as "Power 102.9". The station is currently owned  by a divestiture trust of Townsquare Media.

The station has an FM booster, KARS-FM1, licensed for Fort Collins, Colorado on 102.9 MHz; the booster has been licensed since September 2007.

History
The station changed its call sign from KIOZ to KRQU on March 12, 1984. On March 25, 2002, the station changed its call sign to the current KARS.

In December 2008, the station dropped the oldies format and began simulcasting KMAX-FM 94.3's classic hits format.

On March 12, 2009, KARS-FM changed their format to classic rock, branded as "Rock 102.9".

On September 5, 2019, KARS-FM flipped to Rhythmic contemporary as "Power 102.9," bringing the format to the state of Wyoming for the first time.

References

External links

 Radio Locator Information on KARS-FM-1

ARS-FM
Radio stations established in 1974
Rhythmic contemporary radio stations in the United States
Laramie, Wyoming
1974 establishments in Wyoming
Townsquare Media radio stations